Lehigh Valley Railroad Depot is a historic railroad depot building located at Cazenovia in Madison County, New York.  It was built in 1894 as a depot for the Elmira, Cortland and Northern Railroad, later the Lehigh Valley Railroad.  It is a -story, rectangular, gable-roofed, largely clapboarded structure.  It is a distinctive example of the Stick-Eastlake–style architecture.  It was abandoned by the railroad in 1965. This was a stop on the Lehigh Valley's Elmira and Cortland Branch which actually went to Canastota and Camden, on the section between Cortland and Canastota. Service was eliminated by the early 1940s.

It was added to the National Register of Historic Places in 1991.

References

Railway stations on the National Register of Historic Places in New York (state)
Railway stations in the United States opened in 1894
Railway stations closed in 1965
Former Lehigh Valley Railroad stations
National Register of Historic Places in Cazenovia, New York
1894 establishments in New York (state)
1965 disestablishments in New York (state)